Jacks Knob is a mountain located on the border of Towns County and Union County, Georgia, with a peak elevation of 3,813 feet.  The Appalachian Trail crosses the southern flank of the mountain and Jacks Knob Trail ends here at an intersection with the Appalachian Trail.  Jacks Knob is in the Mark Trail Wilderness of the Chattahoochee National Forest.

The source of the Chattahoochee River is located in Jacks Gap at the southeastern foot of Jacks Knob, in the very southeastern corner of Union County.

References

External links
TopoQuest Map of Jacks Knob

Mountains of Georgia (U.S. state)
Mountains of Towns County, Georgia
Mountains of Union County, Georgia
Chattahoochee-Oconee National Forest